The 1997 World Allround Speed Skating Championships were held on 14–16 February 1997 in the M-Wave stadium in Nagano, Japan.

Title defenders were the 1996 world champions Gunda Niemann-Stirnemann from Germany and Rintje Ritsma from the Netherlands.

Gunda Niemann-Stirnemann from Germany and Ids Postma from the Netherlands became world champions.

Allround results

Men

bold signifies championship record.

Women

bold signifies championship record.

References

External links
Results on SpeedSkatingNews

1997 World Allround
World Allround Speed Skating Championships
World Allround, 1997